Jami L. Resch is the former chief of police of the police bureau of Portland, Oregon, United States. She served in that role from December 31, 2019, until June 8, 2020.

Early life and education

Resch was born in Montana, and moved to the Beaverton area early in her life. She attended Beaverton High School. She went on to graduate from the University of Portland in 1996 with a bachelor's degree in allied health and a minor in psychology.

Career
Resch, who originally wanted to become a doctor, joined the Portland Police Bureau in 1999 in a recruiting push that hired 80 new officers. Over the next two decades, Resch rose through the ranks; she was promoted to Sergeant in 2008, Lieutenant in 2012, and Captain in October 2016. After her promotion to captain, she served as Acting Commander of the North Precinct. In May 2018 she was appointed Assistant Chief of the Investigations Branch. On May 3, 2019, she began to serve as Deputy Chief.

On December 30, 2019 Portland Mayor Ted Wheeler announced the resignation of Resch's predecessor, Danielle Outlaw; he named Resch as her replacement in the same announcement. Resch was sworn in the following day. Whereas Wheeler hired Outlaw after a lengthy national search with public input, the mayor chose to promote Resch from within the bureau immediately and without public input. She is the 49th person to serve as chief.

On June 8, 2020, Resch stepped down as chief of police, handing over the position to Chuck Lovell after her handling of the George Floyd protests was met with controversy.

References

1970s births
Living people
Chiefs of the Portland Police Bureau
University of Portland alumni